The 1st District of Budapest is the Castle District ( or ) and is the historical part of the Buda side of Budapest. It consists of the Buda Castle Hill and some other neighborhoods around it, like Tabán, Krisztinaváros and parts of Gellért Hill.

Location
The Castle District is situated on the banks of the Danube, in the Buda side.

Neighbours of District I are (clockwise from north):
 River Danube
 District XI: Újbuda ("New Buda"), which is most known of the universities and student life
 District XII: Hegyvidék ("Highlands")
District II

Landmarks
Buda Castle
Matthias Church
Hungarian National Gallery
Castle Hill Funicular
Sándor Palace
Fisherman's Bastion
Labyrinth of Buda Castle
Gellért Hill

Politics 
The current mayor of I. District of Budapest is Márta V. Naszályi (Dialogue).

The District Assembly, elected at the 2019 local government elections, is made up of 15 members (1 Mayor, 10 Individual constituencies MEPs and 4 Compensation List MEPs) divided into this political parties and alliances:

List of mayors

Twin towns – sister cities

Várkerület is twinned with:

 Križevci, Croatia
 Capestrano, Italy
 Carouge, Switzerland
 Innere Stadt (Vienna), Austria
 Lendava, Slovenia
 Adalar of Istanbul, Turkey
 Marlow, United Kingdom
 Mukachevo, Ukraine
 Odorheiu Secuiesc, Romania
 Old Town (Bratislava), Slovakia
 Senta, Serbia
 Regensburg, Germany
 Savonlinna, Finland
 Prague 1 (Prague), Czech Republic
 Newbridge, Ireland
 Gränna, Sweden
 Śródmieście (Warsaw), Poland
 Verkiai of Vilnius, Lithuania
 Elche, Spain
 Orikumi, Albania
 Hvidovre Municipality, Denmark
 Maardu, Estonia

Notes

References

External links